Pirkko Hannele Pokka (born 25 May 1952) is a former governor of the province of Lapland. She was the fifth Governor of Lapland and the first woman to hold the office.

She was married to a municipal administrator Esko Johannes Tavia (1993–2008), and is the mother of a daughter. She has written several romance novels.

She served as Minister of Justice during the Esko Aho's cabinet from April 1991 to April 1994.

Chronology of her political career
Ministry of Education 1975
Counsel to the Agricultural Producers' Association 1976–1979
Associate judge on the Insurance Court 1977–1979
Member of Parliament 1979–1994
Minister of Justice 1991–1994
Governor of Lapland 1994–2008

References

External links
 State provincial office of Lapland 

1952 births
Living people
People from Ruovesi
Finnish Lutherans
Centre Party (Finland) politicians
Ministers of Justice of Finland
Members of the Parliament of Finland (1979–83)
Members of the Parliament of Finland (1983–87)
Members of the Parliament of Finland (1987–91)
Members of the Parliament of Finland (1991–95)
Women government ministers of Finland
20th-century Finnish lawyers
Finnish women lawyers
Female justice ministers
Women members of the Parliament of Finland